Dmitri Parkhachev (born 2 January 1985) is a Belarusian former footballer.

Career
Parkhachev began his career playing for Belarusian Premier League sides Dnepr-Transmash Mogilev, Dinamo Minsk and Dinamo Brest. In the summer of 2007, he joined Azerbaijani club Olimpik Baku. The following summer he moved to Kazakhstan, where he would play for Vostok, Ordabasy and Tobol in successive seasons.

Parkhachev joined Zhetysu in July 2010.

Honours
Dinamo Minsk
Belarusian Premier League champion: 2004

Dinamo Brest
Belarusian Cup winner: 2006–07

Tobol
Kazakhstan Premier League champion: 2010

References

External links
 
 

1985 births
Living people
Belarusian footballers
Association football midfielders
Belarusian expatriate footballers
Expatriate footballers in Azerbaijan
Expatriate footballers in Kazakhstan
Kazakhstan Premier League players
FC RUOR Minsk players
FC Dnepr Mogilev players
FC Dinamo Minsk players
FC Dynamo Brest players
AZAL PFK players
FC Vostok players
FC Ordabasy players
FC Tobol players
FC Zhetysu players
Kapaz PFK players
FC Kaisar players
FC Slavia Mozyr players
FC Atyrau players
FC Gorodeya players
FC Krumkachy Minsk players
People from Kobryn
Sportspeople from Brest Region